The Indonesian word for a lighthouse is mercusuar or sometimes menara suar.

Below is a list of lighthouses in Indonesia. The list is divided into regions. Tanjung and ujung are words for capes, pulau is an island, selat is a strait, karang is a reef, and teluk is a bay/gulf.

Sumatra
Sumatra is the westernmost of the major islands of Indonesia. It is separated from Malaysia to the north by the Malacca Strait, from Borneo to the northeast by the broad Karimata Strait, and from Java to the southeast by the Sunda Strait.

Java
Java is the world's most populous island with more than 130 million residents. The national capital, Jakarta, is on the northwestern coast of Java.

Sunda Islands

Kalimantan

Sulawesi
Sulawesi (Celebes) consists of four narrow peninsulas. The Makassar Strait is to the west, separating Sulawesi from Kalimantan (Borneo) to the west. The Celebes Sea is north of the island, the Banda Sea is to the east and southeast, and the Flores Sea is on the south. Makassar is the major port.

Maluku

Papua
The Dutch extended their claim to western New Guinea, world's second-largest island, in 1828, but they established no major settlements until nearly 1900. West Papua remained under Dutch control until 1963, when it was ceded to Indonesia. The principal towns today are Jayapura (formerly Hollandia) and Manokwari in the north, Sorong at the west end of the island, and Merauke in the south.

See also
 Lists of lighthouses and lightvessels

References

External links 

 

Indonesia

Lighthouses
Lighthouses